Clive James Currie (born 25 December 1955) is a former New Zealand rugby union player and cricketer.

Rugby union
A fullback, Currie represented Wellington and Canterbury at a provincial level, and was a member of the New Zealand national side, the All Blacks, on their 1978 tour of Britain and Ireland. He played four matches on that tour, including two internationals, before receiving a broken jaw in the test against Wales.

Cricket
A left-handed batsman and right-arm offbreak bowler, Currie played for the New Zealand secondary schools cricket team, and later appeared in three first-class matches for Wellington in the 1976–77 season.

References

1955 births
Living people
Rugby union players from Wellington City
Cricketers from Wellington City
People educated at Rongotai College
New Zealand rugby union players
New Zealand international rugby union players
Wellington rugby union players
Canterbury rugby union players
Rugby union fullbacks
Wellington cricketers